Mitunduruni is an administrative ward in the Singida Urban district of the Singida Region of Tanzania. According to the 2002 census, the ward has a total population of 8,905.

References

Wards of Singida Region